Kenichi Emura (born 1955) is a Japanese international lawn bowler.

Bowls career
Emura a computer consultant by trade won the national singles title in 2013 and represented Japan in the 2016 World Outdoor Bowls Championship in Christchurch winning a bronze medal in the triples with Hisaharu Satoh and Kenta Hasebe. The bronze medal was the first ever bowls medal won by the nation.

He won a triples silver medal at the 2015 Asia Pacific Bowls Championships in Christchurch.

References 

1955 births
Living people
Japanese male bowls players